The Church of the Holy Family is a historic Roman Catholic church building in Eveleth, Minnesota, United States.  It was built in 1909 by a Slovene American congregation and anchored its ethnic community for seventy years.  The building was listed on the National Register of Historic Places in 1980 for its local significance in the themes of religion and social history.  It was nominated for serving as a long-time community anchor for one of Eveleth's major ethnic groups.

Eveleth's three ethnic Roman Catholic parishes merged in the late 20th century, first with the historically Irish St. Patrick's church joining the Holy Family congregation in 1968.  Ten years later, with the addition of the historically Italian congregation from Immaculate Conception church, Holy Family was renamed Resurrection Church.

See also
 List of Catholic churches in the United States
 National Register of Historic Places listings in St. Louis County, Minnesota

References

External links

The Catholic Parishes of Resurrection & St. Joseph

1909 establishments in Minnesota
Churches in St. Louis County, Minnesota
Churches in the Roman Catholic Diocese of Duluth
Gothic Revival church buildings in Minnesota
National Register of Historic Places in St. Louis County, Minnesota
Roman Catholic churches completed in 1909
Churches on the National Register of Historic Places in Minnesota
Slovene-American culture in Minnesota
Slovene-American history
20th-century Roman Catholic church buildings in the United States